Phyllonorycter clemensella is a moth of the family Gracillariidae. It is known from Québec in Canada and Illinois, Kentucky, New York, Ohio, Maine, Connecticut and Michigan in the United States.

The wingspan is 6-6.5 mm.

The larvae feed on Acer species, including Acer saccharinum. They mine the leaves of their host plant. The mine has the form of a tentiform mine on the underside of the leaf.

References

External links
Bug Guide

clemensella
Moths of North America
Moths described in 1871